The 1973–74 La Liga was the 43rd season since its establishment. It started on September 1, 1973, and finished on May 20, 1974.

Team locations

League table

Results table

Pichichi Trophy

References 
 La Liga 1973-74
 Primera División 1973/74
 Futbolme.com
 All rounds in La Liga 1973/74
 List of La Liga Champions

External links 
  Official LFP Site

1973 1974
1973–74 in Spanish football leagues
Spain